The 1977 Amstel Gold Race was the 12th edition of the annual road bicycle race "Amstel Gold Race", held on Sunday April 9, 1977, in the Dutch province of Limburg. The race stretched 230 kilometres, with the start in Heerlen and the finish in Meerssen. There were a total of 145 competitors, while 54 cyclists finished the race.

Result

References

Amstel Gold Race
Amstel Gold Race
1977 in Dutch sport
1977 Super Prestige Pernod